Martine Pinville (born 23 October 1958 in Angoulême, Charente) was a member of the National Assembly of France until 2017.  She represented the Charente department (the 4th then the 1st constituencies), and was a member of the socialist group.

References

1958 births
Living people
People from Angoulême
Socialist Party (France) politicians
Members of the Regional Council of Nouvelle-Aquitaine
Women members of the National Assembly (France)
Deputies of the 13th National Assembly of the French Fifth Republic
Deputies of the 14th National Assembly of the French Fifth Republic
Women government ministers of France
21st-century French women politicians
Politicians from Nouvelle-Aquitaine